Kuala Nanggroe Football Club (simply known as KNFC or Kuala Nanggroe FC) is an Indonesian football club based in Banda Aceh, Aceh. They currently compete in the Liga 3 and their homeground is H. Dimurthala Stadium.

Honours
 Liga 3 Aceh
 Champion: 2017

References

External links
Kuala Nanggroe FC Instagram

Banda Aceh
Football clubs in Indonesia
 Football clubs in Aceh
Association football clubs established in 2017
2017 establishments in Indonesia